The 1997 La Flèche Wallonne was the 61st edition of La Flèche Wallonne cycle race and was held on 16 April 1997. The race started in Spa and finished in Huy. The race was won by Laurent Jalabert of the ONCE team.

General classification

References

1997 in road cycling
1997
1997 in Belgian sport